Coleman is a surname of Irish and English origin. The Irish surname is derived from the Irish Ó'Colmáin, Ó'Clumhain, or Mac Colmáin. The English surname is an occupational name denoting a burner of charcoal, or possibly a servant of a person named Cole.

Notable people with the surname include:

A 
A. E. "Fred" Coleman, African-American discoverer of gold in Julian, California
Adam Coleman (born 1991), Australian rugby union player
Alan Coleman (1936–2013), English-born television writer, director and producer
Alan Coleman (cricketer) (born 1983), English cricketer
Ann Mary Butler Crittenden Coleman (1813–1891), American author, translator
Anthony Coleman (born 1955), American jazz pianist
Asa Coleman (c. 1830s – after 1893), African-American politician, former slave
Ada Coleman (1875–1966), English barmaid

B 
Barry Coleman, (born 2009), American singer dancer
Blake Coleman, (born 1991), American ice hockey player

C 
Catherine Coleman (born 1960), American astronaut
Chad Coleman (born 1966/1967), American actor
Charles Coleman, multiple people
Charlotte Coleman (1968–2001), English actress
Chase Coleman (born 1985), American actor, director, writer and musician
Chris Coleman, multiple people
Clarence "Choo-Choo" Coleman (1937–2016), American baseball catcher
Clive Coleman (born 1961), English lawyer, journalist and comedy writer
Corey Coleman (born 1994), American football player
Craig Coleman (born 1963), Australian rugby league footballer
Cy Coleman (1929–2004), American composer, songwriter and jazz pianist

D 
Daisy Coleman (1997–2020), American sexual abuse victim advocate
D'Alton Corry Coleman (1879–1956), Canadian businessman and president of the Canadian Pacific Railway
Dabney Coleman (born 1932), American actor
David Coleman, multiple people
Davon Coleman (born 1991), American football player
Derrick Coleman (born 1967), pro basketball player
Des Coleman (born 1965), British actor and presenter
Dominic Coleman (born 1970), British actor
D. C. Coleman (1920–1995), British economic historian
D. Jackson Coleman (born 1934), American doctor and inventor
Don Coleman (offensive tackle) (1928–2017), American football player
Don Coleman (linebacker) (born 1952), American football player and entrepreneur
Don Coleman, Canadian rock singer
Donald Coleman (1925–1991), British politician
Doriane Lambelet Coleman, Swiss American law professor
Doug Coleman, American politician in Arizona
Dylan Coleman (born 1996), American baseball player

E 
Earl Thomas Coleman (born 1943), former US Congressman
Edgar Coleman, classical pianist
Eli Coleman (born 1941), American sexologist
Eliot Coleman (born 1936), American farmer, author, agricultural researcher and educator
Elliot D. Coleman (1881–1963), Louisiana sheriff and bodyguard of Huey P. Long Jr.
Eric Coleman (born 1966), former American footballer

F 
Fred Coleman (born 1975), American footballer

G 
Garnet Coleman (born 1961), US politician, Texas House of Representatives
Gary Coleman (1968–2010), American actor
Gary B.B. Coleman (1947–1994), American blues guitarist, singer, songwriter and record producer
Geoff Coleman (footballer) (born 1936), English footballer
George Coleman, multiple people
Gerald Coleman (born 1985), American ice hockey goalkeeper
Greg Coleman (born 1954), American football player

H 
Helena Coleman (1860–1953), Canadian poet, music teacher, and writer
Herb Coleman, multiple people

I 
Iain Coleman (born 1958), former member of the UK Parliament

J 
Jack Coleman, multiple people
Jacqueline Coleman (born 1982), American educator, politician, and Lieutenant Governor of Kentucky
James Coleman, multiple people
Jamie Coleman (born 1975), American football player
Jean Coleman (1908–1982), World War II S.O.E. agent in France
Jean Coleman (1918–2008), Australian sprinter
Jean Ellen Coleman (1928–1996), American librarian
Jenna Coleman (born 1986), English actress
Jerry Coleman (1924–2014), baseball player and broadcaster
Jerry "Bo" Coleman (born 1936), American radio personality
Jermaine Coleman, better known as J. Cole (born 1985), American hip-hop artist
Jim Coleman (journalist) (1911–2001), Canadian sports journalist, writer and press secretary
Joe Coleman (disambiguation) or Joseph Coleman, multiple people
John Coleman, multiple people
Jonathan Coleman, multiple people

K 
KaRon Coleman (born 1976), American football player
Kelly Coleman (1938–2019), American basketball player

L 
Larnel Coleman (born 1998), American football player
Lavon Coleman (born 1994), American football player
Leonard S. Coleman Jr. (born 1949), American baseball executive
Leonard Coleman (born 1962), former American footballer
Leslie Coleman (1878–1954), Canadian agricultural scientist in India
Lisa Coleman (disambiguation), multiple people
Loren Coleman (born 1947), American scientist
Lorenzo Coleman (1975–2013), American basketball player
L. Zenobia Coleman (1898–1999), American librarian
L. Lamont Coleman (1974–1999), American-American rapper and songwriter

M 
Marie Coleman (born 1933). Australian feminist, social activist, public servant and journalist.
Margot Valerie Coleman, British judge 
Mark Coleman (born 1964), American mixed martial arts fighter
Martin Coleman (born 1950), Irish hurler
Martin Coleman, Jnr, his son, Irish hurler
Mary Sue Coleman (born 1943), American scientist and educator
Matthew Coleman, better known as Sketch, Australian DJ and electronic music producer
Michael Coleman, multiple people
Megan Kate Coleman (born 1985), South African beauty queen
Monique Coleman (born 1980), American actress

N 
Nicholas Coleman (disambiguation), several people named Nicholas or Nick Coleman
Noel Coleman (1919–2007), English actor
Norm Coleman (born 1949), American politician
Norman Jay Coleman (1827–1911), American newspaper publisher and politician
Norris Coleman (born 1961), American NBA forward, 1994 Israeli Basketball Premier League MVP
Noah coleman (born 2013) no job or wikipedia

O 
Ornette Coleman (1930–2015), American jazz saxophonist

P 
Percy Coleman, motorcycle racer
Percy Coleman (1892–1934), Australian politician
Peter Coleman-Wright (born 1958), Australian baritone opera singer
Phil Coleman (athlete) (1931–2021), American runner
Phil Coleman (footballer) (born 1960), English footballer
Priscilla Coleman (artist), court artist
Priscilla K. Coleman, American college professor

R 
Ralph Coleman (1895–1990), American college baseball coach
Richard Coleman (1930–2008), English actor
Robert Coleman, multiple people named Robert, Bob or Bobby
Ronald Coleman, multiple people named Ronald or Ronnie

S 
Séamus Coleman (born 1988), Irish footballer
Sharon L. Coleman (born 1945), American politician
Sidney Coleman (1937–2007), American theoretical physicist
Sidney Coleman (American football) (born 1964), former American footballer
Sophie Coleman (born 1990), British triathlete
Stephen Coleman (born 1973), American film orchestrator
Stephen Coleman (professor), British Professor of Communication
Steve Coleman (born 1956), American saxophonist
Steve Coleman (American football) (born 1950), American football player

T 
Tevin Coleman (born 1993), American football player
Terry Coleman (born 1943), American politician from Georgia
Thomas Coleman, multiple people
Travis Coleman (born 1980), American football player
Tony Coleman (born 1945), former English footballer
Townsend Coleman (born 1954), American voice actor

V 
Vanessa Coleman, one of the perpetrators in the murders of Channon Christian and Christopher Newsom
Vas Coleman, birth name of Yung Bans, American rapper and songwriter
Vernon Coleman (born 1946), English conspiracy theorist 
Vince Coleman, multiple people

W 
Wanda Coleman (1946–2013), American poet
Warren Coleman (1901–1968), American operatic baritone
William Coleman, multiple people

X 
Xavier Coleman (born 1995), American football player

Z 
Zendaya Coleman, better known as Zendaya (born 1996), American actress, dancer, and singer

Fictional characters 
 Cameron Coleman, a character in Vought News Network: Seven on 7 with Cameron Coleman, and the third season of The Boys

References

See also 
 Colman (surname)
 Justice Coleman (disambiguation)
 Kohlmann
 Kohlman
 Kollmann (Kollman)
 Kolman, Colmán (Colman)

Occupational surnames
English-language surnames
Surnames of Irish origin
Surnames of English origin
English-language occupational surnames